The Evpatoria Report is a Swiss post-rock band. The band was formed in January 2002, and it consists of two guitarists, a bassist, a drummer, and a violinist/keyboardist. The Evpatoria Report have played concerts in Paris and toured throughout Switzerland, playing with bands such as Red Sparowes, The Appleseed Cast, and Mono. The band was on a hiatus from 2008 until they announced their return to the studio in April 2015.

History

The band was formed in January 2002 and is named for the Ukrainian city Yevpatoria in Crimea (romanized from  Russian as Evpatoria), in which the radio telescope RT-70 P-2500 is located. It sends messages into space, including A Message From Earth and Cosmic Call, that try to describe human life or "the Evpatoria message".

Members
 Laurent Quint – guitar
 Simon Robert – guitar
 David Di Lorenzo – bass
 Fabrice Berney – drums, glockenspiel
 Daniel Bacsinszky – violin, keyboard

Discography
Studio albums
 Golevka (2005)
 Maar (2008)
EPs
 The Evpatoria Report (2003)

References

External links
 Official Bandcamp
 Official Myspace.com Site

Swiss post-rock groups
Musical groups established in 2002
2002 establishments in Switzerland